Hayduta Buttress (‘Rid Hayduta’ \'rid hay-'du-ta\) is the rounded, mostly ice-covered buttress 13.5 km long in E-W direction and 7.5 km wide, rising to 1287 m on the west side of Hemimont Plateau on Fallières Coast in Graham Land, Antarctica. The feature has steep and partly ice-free south, west and north slopes, and surmounts Perutz Glacier to the south, Blind Bay to the west and Barnes Glacier to the north.

The buttress is named after Hayduta Peak in Rila Mountain, Bulgaria.

Location
British mapping in 1978.

Maps
Antarctic Digital Database (ADD). Scale 1:250000 topographic map of Antarctica. Scientific Committee on Antarctic Research (SCAR). Since 1993, regularly upgraded and updated.
British Antarctic Territory. Scale 1:200000 topographic map. DOS 610 Series, Sheet W 67 66. Directorate of Overseas Surveys, Tolworth, UK, 1978.

Notes

References
 Bulgarian Antarctic Gazetteer. Antarctic Place-names Commission. (details in Bulgarian, basic data in English)
 Hayduta Buttress. SCAR Composite Antarctic Gazetteer

External links
 Hayduta Buttress. Copernix satellite image

Mountains of Graham Land
Bulgaria and the Antarctic
Fallières Coast